Kumarankary is a village in Kuttanad, Alappuzha district, Kerala, India. It borders Kottayam and Alappuzha districts.

Administration 
Kumarankary is spread over Kottayam and Alappuzha districts but it is considered to be a part of Alappuzha district. It is spread  in 2 wards(WARD 3&4) of Veliyanadu Grama Panchayat in Veliyanad Block Panchayat(Alappuzha district) and ward number 21 of Vazhappally Grama Panchayat in Madappally Block Panchayat(Kottayam district).

Location 
Kumarankary village is located 5.5 km to the west of Changanacherry, a Historic town of Central Travancore and 4 km North of Alappuzha-Changanacherry road. a population of about 600.

Points of interest 
 Kumarankary Sri Dharma Sastha Temple 
 St Mary Church

Transportation 
Until recently, the only transportation available to reach Kumarankary is the boat operated by water Transport Department from Changanacherry which disembarks at the Kumaramkary Ambalam (temple) Jetty. Present development of road networks from Changanacherry and Kottayam town made the travel to the village easier. Now there is regularly scheduled bus service from Changanassaery KSRTC depot to Kumarankary.

References

Villages in Alappuzha district